The Dothan Metropolitan Statistical Area, as defined by the United States Census Bureau, is an area consisting of Geneva, Henry, and Houston counties in southeastern Alabama, anchored by the city of Dothan, county seat of Houston County. As of the 2010 census, the MSA had a population of 145,639.

Counties
Geneva
Henry
Houston

Communities

Places with more than 50,000 inhabitants
Dothan (Principal city; partial)

Places with 2,000 to 10,000 inhabitants
Abbeville
Geneva
Hartford
Headland
Samson
Slocomb

Places with 1,000 to 2,000 inhabitants
Ashford
Cottonwood
Cowarts
Kinsey
Malvern
Taylor
Webb

Places with fewer than 1,000 inhabitants
Avon
Black
Coffee Springs
Columbia
Eunola
Gordon
Haleburg
Madrid
Newville
Rehobeth

Combined Statistical Area
The Dothan Metropolitan Statistical Area is a significant part of the Dothan-Enterprise-Ozark Combined Statistical Area, which is composed of the Dothan metropolitan area, the Enterprise micropolitan area, and the Ozark micropolitan area. As of the 2010 census, the CSA had a population of 245,838.

See also
Alabama census statistical areas

References

 
Geography of Houston County, Alabama
Geography of Henry County, Alabama
Geography of Geneva County, Alabama